Salvatore Esposito (born September 16, 2001) is an American professional soccer player who plays as a forward for New York Red Bulls II in the USL Championship.

Career
Esposito started his career with Manhattan Kickers before moving to Italy in 2010 and playing with Genoa's youth team. He stayed there for seven years before moving to the academy at Napoli in 2017. However, one year later, Esposito returned to the United States to join the New York Red Bulls academy side.

On May 7, 2019, Esposito came on for the New York Red Bulls U-23 side in their second round U.S. Open Cup match against FC Motown. He came on as an 81st–minute substitute for Vincent Borden and scored the final penalty in a 5–3 shootout victory. A couple of weeks later, on May 24, Esposito made his professional debut when he came on as a substitute for New York Red Bulls II in their USL Championship match against North Carolina FC. He came on in the 85th–minute substitute for Ben Mines as Red Bulls II was defeated 2–1.

International
Esposito earned his first international call-up for the United States under-18 side in 2018.

Career statistics

References

External links 
 US Development Academy Profile.

2001 births
Living people
American soccer players
New York Red Bulls II players
Association football forwards
USL Championship players
Expatriate footballers in Italy